Chasovnoye is a rural locality (a village) in Moseyevskoye Rural Settlement, Totemsky  District, Vologda Oblast, Russia. The population was 6 as of 2002.

Geography 
Chasovnoye is located 30 km northwest of Totma (the district's administrative centre) by road. Moseyevo is the nearest rural locality.

References 

Rural localities in Tarnogsky District